Payoyo cheese (Spanish: queso payoyo or queso de cabra payoya) is a type of cheese made from the milk of Payoya goats and Merina grazalemeña sheep in Villaluenga del Rosario and other areas of the Sierra de Grazalema, Spain. It began production in 1997 and has become a staple of Spanish delicatessen. The term payoyo is the demonym for Villaluenga del Rosario.

In 1986, ten years before the name "payoyo cheese" was popularized by Queso Payoyo SL, production of the same type of cheese had begun in the nearby village of El Bosque by the company El Bosqueño. In 2016, El Bosqueño's payoyo cheese finished third at the World Cheese Awards. In 2018, La Pastora de Grazalema, another brand of payoyo cheese, was ranked no. 1 in the category "best mixed-milk cheeses" at the Salón de Gourmets, IFEMA, Madrid.

Distribution 
Payoyo cheeses are distributed throughout Spain and exported to countries such as the United Kingdom, the United States, South Korea, Japan, Italy, Sweden and Belgium. They have received several prestigious both national and international awards.

References

Spanish cheeses
Andalusian cuisine
Sheep's-milk cheeses
Goat's-milk cheeses
Mixed-milk cheeses